Masoala kona is a species of flowering plant in the Palm Family (Arecaceae or Palmae). It is a palm endemic to Madagascar, where it grows in rainforests. There are fewer than 60 individuals estimated to remain. A leaf segment has a broad attachment to the rachis rather than a petiolule. It differs from a lobed leaf in that the lamina (leaf) is not continuous. The species is threatened by habitat loss.

References

kona
Endemic flora of Madagascar
Endangered plants
Taxonomy articles created by Polbot
Taxa named by Henk Jaap Beentje